Jalandhar Cantonment is a cantonment town in Jalandhar District in the Indian state of Punjab. The Cantonment is located between latitude 30° 18' and longitude 75° 37' on the southwest and at a distance of 2 km from Cantonment Railway Station and 5 km from City Railway Station. It is situated beside Grand Trunk Road at a distance of 89 km from Amritsar and 371 km from Delhi. It covers an area of 5.87 square miles (15.2 km²). It is on Amritsar-Delhi Broad Gauge Main Line. A Class-I airfield at Adampur is situated at a distance of 19 km. The airfield is linked with Jalandhar Cantonment by rail and road.
It has a Recruiting Office responsible for enlisting the soldiers for Army, Navy and Air Force. The first Recruiting Officer who held this post until 1952 was Col. Dilbagh Singh Minhas of Jallandhar Doab.

It has very beautiful parks for the public. It has many plant nurseries selling a variety of beautiful plants. It also hosts a flower show every year.

History
It is one of the oldest cantonments in India, established in 1848 after the first Anglo-Sikh War, when the British settled in Northern India. The original scope of this cantonment was limited to troops to quell disturbances from adjoining States for the maintenance of peace and order.

In 1920 the cantonment was the scene of mutiny by Irish soldiers, who were protesting against martial law in Ireland by refusing to obey orders. They took down the Union Flag and replaced it with the flag of the Irish Republic, proclaimed at the time in Dublin (See The Connaught Rangers#Mutiny in India, 1920).

The departure of British from India and subsequent partition of the country changed the complexion of the Cantonment. It has gained tremendous importance on account of its nearness to the border with Pakistan.

Units stationed
Military Hospital Jalandhar was established here to provide health care and education to troops of the Indian army and their families.
It is the peacetime station and family station for the 163 Medium Artillery Regiment, 169 Field Artillery Regiment, 141 Air Defence (SAM) Regiment, 4th Battalion Rajputana Rifles, 4th Battalion of Bengal Sappers and 2nd Signals Battalion. The families of soldiers and officers of the above units live in the cantonment housing.

Demographics
As of the 2011 Census of India, Jalandhar Cantonment had a population of 47,845. Males constitute 59% of the population and females 41%. Jalandhar Cantonment has an average literacy rate of 81%, higher than the national average of 59.5%: male literacy is 85%, and female literacy is 75%. In Jalandhar Cantonment, 10% of the population is under 6 years of age.

References

External Links

Cities and towns in Jalandhar district
Cantonments of India
Cantonments of British India
1848 establishments in British India